Aileen Anna Maria Garmson ( Douglas, later Wrack and then Cooke;  1863 – 30 May 1951) was a New Zealand trade unionist and political activist. She was born in County Cavan, Ireland in circa 1863.

References

1860s births
1951 deaths
New Zealand trade unionists
New Zealand activists
New Zealand women activists
People from County Cavan
Unsuccessful candidates in the 1919 New Zealand general election